Renske Endel (born 13 July 1983, Noord-Scharwoude) is a Dutch former artistic gymnast. She won the silver medal on uneven bars at the 2001 World Championships, which was the first World medal won by a Dutch gymnast since 1903. She was unable to compete at the 2004 Olympic Games due to injury and retired shortly afterwards. 

Endel currently works as a motivational speaker and acrobat at Corpus Acrobatics in Amsterdam.

References

1983 births
Living people
Dutch female artistic gymnasts
Medalists at the World Artistic Gymnastics Championships
People from Langedijk
Sportspeople from North Holland
20th-century Dutch women
21st-century Dutch women